Else Reval (14 June 1893 – 25 January 1978) was a German film actress.

Selected filmography
 War in Peace (1925)
 The World Wants To Be Deceived (1926)
 Marriage Announcement (1926)
 The Eleven Schill Officers (1926)
 Marie's Soldier (1927)
 How Do I Marry the Boss? (1927)
 The Bordello in Rio (1927)
 The False Prince (1927)
 Bigamy (1927)
 Because I Love You (1928)
 Der Herzensphotograph (1928)
 Who Invented Divorce? (1928)
 You Walk So Softly (1928)
 Escape from Hell (1928)
 Sixteen Daughters and No Father (1928)
 Dear Homeland (1929)
 The Lord of the Tax Office  (1929)
 Come Back, All Is Forgiven (1929)
 Pension Schöller (1930)
 The Cabinet of Doctor Larifari (1930)
 Mischievous Miss (1930)
 Retreat on the Rhine (1930)
 Marriage in Name Only (1930)
 Without Meyer, No Celebration is Complete (1931)
 Student Life in Merry Springtime (1931)
 When the Soldiers (1931)
 The Testament of Cornelius Gulden (1932)
 Scandal in Budapest (1933)
 The Sandwich Girl (1933)
 Bashful Felix (1934)
 The Daring Swimmer (1934)
 Holiday From Myself (1934)
 Variety (1935)
 City of Anatol (1936)
 The Cabbie's Song (1936)
 Street Music (1936)
 Orders Are Orders (1936)
 Diamonds (1937)
 His Best Friend (1937)
 Red Orchids (1938)
 Between the Parents (1938)
 Storms in May (1938)
 A Woman Like You (1938)
 In the Name of the People (1939)
 The Star of Rio (1940)
 Wedding in Barenhof (1942)
 A Salzburg Comedy (1943)
 When the Young Wine Blossoms (1943)
 Tell the Truth (1946)
 Don't Dream, Annette (1949)
 Don't Play with Love (1949)
 Miracles Still Happen (1951)
 The Heath Is Green (1951)
 At the Well in Front of the Gate (1952)
 The Day Before the Wedding (1952)
 When the Heath Dreams at Night (1952)
 Holiday From Myself (1952)
 Mailman Mueller (1953)
 Hooray, It's a Boy! (1953)
 The Private Secretary (1953)
 Lady's Choice (1953)
 We'll Talk About Love Later (1953)
 On the Reeperbahn at Half Past Midnight (1954)
 Emil and the Detectives (1954)
 The Captain and His Hero (1955)
 My Sixteen Sons (1956)

References

Bibliography
 Giesen, Rolf. Nazi Propaganda Films: A History and Filmography. McFarland, 2003.

External links

1893 births
1978 deaths
Actresses from Berlin
German film actresses
German silent film actresses
German stage actresses
20th-century German actresses